Paolo Filomarino, C.R. (1562 – 27 May 1623) was a Roman Catholic prelate who served as Bishop of Caiazzo (1617–1623).

Biography
Paolo Filomarino was born in Naples, Italy in 1562 and ordained a priest in the Congregation of Clerics Regular of the Divine Providence. On 18 September 1617, he was appointed during the papacy of Pope Paul V as Bishop of Caiazzo. On 24 September 1617, he was consecrated bishop by Ladislao d'Aquino, Bishop of Venafro. He served as Bishop of Caiazzo until his death on 27 May 1623.

References

External links and additional sources
 (for Chronology of Bishops) 
 (for Chronology of Bishops)  

17th-century Italian Roman Catholic bishops
Bishops appointed by Pope Paul V
1562 births
1623 deaths
Clergy from Naples
Clerics regular
Theatine bishops